Saife is a mountain of the Garhwal Himalaya in Uttarakhand India. It is 147th highest located entirely within the Uttrakhand. Nanda Devi, is the highest mountain in this category. It lies 1.5 km SSE of Sudarshan Parbat  its nearest higher neighbor. Shyamvarn  lies 2.5 km ENE and it is 2.4 km south of Shwetvarna . It lies 4.4 km SSW of Yogeshwar .

Climbing history
It was first climbed by "Diganta", a mountaineering club from Calcutta in 1978. 
In 1981 An Indo French expedition of eleven member, four French and seven Indian climbers led by Harish Kapadia attempt Sudarshan and six other peaks surrounding the Swetvarn Bamak. On 19 May, Hubert Odier made a solo ascent of Saife. From ABC he proceeded on to the western glacier and climbed the snow slopes to the ridge connecting Saife with Koteshwar I. At 8.50 a.m. he was on the summit. It was again climbed on 30 May by three other member Kanu, Danthi and Kami. They followed the same route to the summit which earlier done by Odier. On 7 June a third attack by the same party, this time Alain and Jacques. They started from ABC at 4 a.m. and reached the top at 6.30 a.m. and were back in the camp at 8.30 a.m for breakfast.

Neighboring and subsidiary peaks
Neighboring or subsidiary peaks of Saife:
 Kalidhang 
 Yogeshwar 
 Chaturbhuj  
 Matri 
 Swetvarn

Glaciers and rivers
Swetvarn Bamak on the Eastern side. Thelu bamak on the Southern side both these Glaciers are tributaries of Raktvarn Bamak which drain itself at Gangotri Glacier. from there emerges Bhagirathi river. one of the main tributaries of river Ganga. Bhagirathi River is one of the main tributaries of river Ganga that later joins Alaknanda River the other main tributaries of river Ganga at Devprayag and became Ganga there after.

See also

 List of Himalayan peaks of Uttarakhand

References

Mountains of Uttarakhand
Six-thousanders of the Himalayas
Geography of Chamoli district